General elections were held in Suriname on 23 May 1996. The result was a victory for the New Front for Democracy and Development (an alliance of the National Party of Suriname, the Progressive Reform Party, the Party for National Unity and Solidarity and the Surinamese Labour Party), which won 24 of the 51 seats. Voter turnout was 66.7%.

Results

References

Suriname
Elections in Suriname
1996 in Suriname